Geneviève Clot (born 29 January 1964) is a former French para table tennis player and swimmer, she has participated in international level in both sports.

References

1964 births
Living people
Sportspeople from Marseille
Paralympic table tennis players of France
Table tennis players at the 2004 Summer Paralympics
Table tennis players at the 2008 Summer Paralympics
Medalists at the 2004 Summer Paralympics
French female table tennis players
Paralympic medalists in table tennis
Paralympic gold medalists for France
Paralympic silver medalists for France
20th-century French women
21st-century French women